The 2014 Railway Budget of India refers to the Railway Budget of the Indian Railways in the fiscal year 2014–15. The budget was presented in the India Parliament by Railway Minister D. V. Sadananda Gowda on 8 July 2014.

Summary
The budget emphasized increased amenities for travelers, better safety, and timely completion of projects. There were no fare hikes announced as both passenger and freight fares had been increased the previous month. But, it was announced that fares will be revised twice a year to absorb fuel costs. Gowda criticized previous governments for announcing new projects and failing to complete them. He said projects will now be prioritized, such as decongesting major routes instead of announcing new ones. Gowda announced no major new projects, but announced 54 new trains. He also criticized the last government for driving the railways into a loss.

He said  will be installed in major stations to monitor cleanliness, and major stations will have food courts serving local cuisines and precooked food from reputable catering brands will be served on board. The railways have faced complaints of substandard food in the past.

He announced the introduction of a new rail-flaw detection system to better investigate the causes of accidents.  The budget allocated a significant sum to the construction of bridges at unmanned crossings, a major cause of rail-track deaths. He announced a new project to introduce automatic closing doors on mainline and suburban trains, and said  will be provided in larger stations and select trains.  will be available for on-board use for a fee by business travelers. The e-ticketing system will be extended from booking tickets to booking coaches and entire trains, and also retiring rooms in stations. Electric mobility carts will be provided to elderly and handicapped passengers at all major stations.  Also,  will recruit four thousand female constables and escorted carriages will be provided for women. A significant amount was announced for improving rail connectivity in north-east India.

Some stations are to be improved using PPPs.

Responses
Deven Choksey, managing director at K. R. Choksey securities, said the government now seemed to be more inclined towards PPPs than before. India's stock index  dropped and closed 2% below opening. Investors were observed selling shares in energy, infrastructure, and real estate sectors.

See also
 2015 Railway Budget of India
 Railway Budget of India

References

Further reading
 

Railway Budgets of India
2014 in Indian economy
2014 in rail transport
Railway Budget of India